Calycosia is a genus of flowering plants in the family Rubiaceae. It was described by Asa Gray in 1860. The genus is found in New Guinea, the Solomon Islands, Fiji, Samoa, and the Society Islands.

Species 

 Calycosia callithrix A.C.Sm. - Viti Levu
 Calycosia kajewskii Merr. & L.M.Perry - Solomons
 Calycosia lageniformis (Gillespie) A.C.Sm. - Viti Levu
 Calycosia macrocyatha Fosberg - Fiji
 Calycosia mamosei W.N.Takeuchi - Papua New Guinea
 Calycosia petiolata A.Gray -  Fiji (Viti Levu, Ovalau)
 Calycosia sessilis A.Gray - Samoa
 Calycosia trichocalyx (Drake) Drake - Tahiti

References

External links 
 Calycosia in the World Checklist of Rubiaceae

Psychotrieae
Taxa named by Asa Gray
Rubiaceae genera
Flora without expected TNC conservation status